Mahawa Bangoura Camara (born 13 March 1927) is a Guinean diplomat and politician, the first woman to be the foreign minister of Guinea, Guinea's Ambassador to the United States, and its permanent representative at the United Nations.

Early life
Mahawa Bangoura Camara was born on 13 March 1927 in Conakry, Guinea.

Career
Bangoura was appointed Guinea's Ambassador to the United States in 1995.

Bangoura was Guinea's permanent representative at the United Nations until June 2000, when she became the country's first women foreign minister, succeeding Zainoul Abidine Sannoussi. She was appointed by the President Lansana Conte during a reshuffle which saw five senior ministers being replaced. Bangoura and the new security and interior minister Ahmadou Camara became secretaries of state, and senior status within the cabinet behind the Prime Minister, Lamine Sidime.

In August 2001, she met with her Liberian and Sierra Leonean counterparts in Monrovia, Liberia to try to bring peace to the three countries of the Mano River Union (MRU). Bangoura remained foreign minister until 2002.

References

Susu people
Living people
1927 births
Foreign Ministers of Guinea
Permanent Representatives of Guinea to the United Nations
Ambassadors of Guinea to the United States
Women government ministers of Guinea
Female foreign ministers
Guinean women diplomats
People from Conakry
Guinean women ambassadors